The Ambika Statue from Dhar is a marble statue of the Jain goddess Ambika discovered in the city of Dhar, central India in the late nineteenth century. The statue is famous for its long inscription in Nāgarī on the base that provides a direct link to the royal court of the Paramara dynasty. It has been part of the British Museum's collection since 1880.

Provenance
The statue was found amongst the ruins of the city palace at Dhar, Madhya Pradesh in 1875 by Major General William Kincaid, who at the time worked as the local political agent of the British Raj. Five years after its discovery, the statue became part of the British Museum's collection.

Description
The goddess Ambika is carved from white marble in high relief and wears a tiered headdress with her hair tied to one side. Two arms of the goddess are missing; in the remaining arms, she clasps an elephant goad (aṅkuśa) and either a noose or the stalk of a plant. On the base are shown various other deities and a kneeling female donor with an inscription below.

Inscription
The Nāgarī inscription records the creation of the Ambika statue by Vararuci, after he had made a figure of the goddess Saraswati and three Jinas. It has been suggested that Vararuci is in fact the Jain scholar Dhanapala, who performed a prominent artistic role at the court of King Bhoja during the 11th Century AD. Bhoja was part of the Paramara dynasty who based themselves primarily at Dhar, a city which remained their de facto capital until its ultimate conquest in the fourteenth century.

References

Further reading
M Willis, 'Dhār, Bhoja and Sarasvatī: from Indology to Political Mythology and Back' in Journal of the Royal Asiatic Society, 22, 1, London, 2012
T. R. Blurton, Hindu art (London, The British Museum Press, 1992)
R Knox, Masterpieces of Buddhist and Hindu Sculpture from the British Museum, 1994

Asian sculptures in the British Museum
Paramara dynasty
Bhoja